José Eduardo Bennett (born 11 September 1968, in La Ceiba) is a Honduran former footballer. He is currently manager of UPNFM.

Club career
Born in La Ceiba, Bennett played in the youth teams of local side Victoria and moved to Tegucigalpa aged 14. There he played college football and later joined Curacao. His debut in Liga Nacional was on 29 September 1988 at the age of 19 wearing Curacao's jersey against Motagua, and he scored to tie 1-1.

Nicknamed El Balín or Demonio (the Demon), he played for Curacao, CD Olimpia and CD Victoria in Honduras, Cobras in Mexico, Argentinos Juniors, San Lorenzo (with whom he won the 1995 Clausura title) and Second Division Chacarita Juniors and Quilmes in 10 years in Argentina as well as for Cobreloa in Chile.

His debut in Honduran Second Division was on February 4, 2007 at the age of 38 for Unión Ájax against Real Sociedad. By May 2009, he has scored 83 goals in the Honduran national league.

At age 41, Bennett retired after playing with Necaxa in the Honduran second division and started training the Necaxa reserves.

International career
Bennett made his debut for Honduras in a May 1991 UNCAF Nations Cup match against Panama and has earned a total of 36 caps, scoring 19 goals. He has represented his country in 11 FIFA World Cup qualification matches and played at the 1991 UNCAF Nations Cup as well as at the 1991, 1993 and 1996 CONCACAF Gold Cups. He is the scorer of the first ever goal at a CONCACAF Gold Cup Finals.

He was substituted in his final international, an April 2000 FIFA World Cup qualification game against Panama.

International goals

Titles

References

External links

 Bennett: “Por ser negro me dicen de todo” - La Nación 
 Futbolistas extranjeros en Argentina

1968 births
Living people
People from La Ceiba
Association football forwards
Honduran footballers
Honduras international footballers
1991 CONCACAF Gold Cup players
1993 CONCACAF Gold Cup players
1996 CONCACAF Gold Cup players
C.D. Olimpia players
Argentinos Juniors footballers
San Lorenzo de Almagro footballers
Cobreloa footballers
Chacarita Juniors footballers
Quilmes Atlético Club footballers
C.D.S. Vida players
C.D. Victoria players
Atlético Olanchano players
Honduran expatriate footballers
Honduran expatriate sportspeople in Chile
Honduran expatriate sportspeople in Mexico
Honduran expatriate sportspeople in Uruguay
Honduran expatriate sportspeople in Argentina
Expatriate footballers in Uruguay
Expatriate footballers in Argentina
Expatriate footballers in Chile
Expatriate footballers in Mexico
Argentine Primera División players
Chilean Primera División players
Liga Nacional de Fútbol Profesional de Honduras players
Honduran Liga Nacional de Ascenso players
Liga MX players
Honduran football managers